Jessie Knight (born 15 June 1994) is an English athlete specialising in the 400 metres hurdles.

Career
Knight became the British champion of the 400 metres hurdles event after winning at the 2020 British Athletics Championships with a time of 55.80 seconds.

In May 2021, she improved on her record at the year's Golden Spike Ostrava with a personal best of 54.74 seconds. She was later named to the British track and field team ahead of the 2020 Summer Olympics for the 400 metres hurdles event alongside Meghan Beesley and Jessica Turner. Upon arriving in Tokyo, Knight was one of six British athletes forced to self-isolate after a passenger on her flight had tested positive for COVID-19. At the Olympics, Knight stumbled in her heat race for the 400 metres hurdles event as she approached the track's first bend and crashed into the first hurdle, ending her hopes to medal in the event. Knight hoped to, but did not, race in the women's 4 x 400 metres relay.

Knight is a primary school teacher by vocation. In 2017, she gave up athletics in favour of the profession, but returned to the sport a year later.

References

Living people
1994 births
English female hurdlers
British female hurdlers
British Athletics Championships winners
Athletes (track and field) at the 2020 Summer Olympics
Olympic athletes of Great Britain
World Athletics Championships medalists